Rosalie Catherine Wilkins, Baroness Wilkins (born 6 May 1946) is a British politician (Labour) and former television presenter.

Wilkins has been a member of the Central Health Services Council from 1974 1976, the BBC General Advisory Council from 1976 to 1978, and the Prince of Wales' Advisory Group on Disability from 1982 to 1990. She was also President of the College of Occupational Therapists from 2003 to 2008.
  	
On 30 July 1999 she was created a life peer with the title Baroness Wilkins, of Chesham Bois in the County of Buckinghamshire. She was a member of the House of Lords until her retirement in 2015.

References

External links
 http://hansard.millbanksystems.com/people/ms-rosalie-wilkins
 http://www.independentliving.org/docs6/evans2003.html
 http://www.eurosource.eu.com/engine.asp?lev1=4&lev2=38&menu=98&biog=y&id=26629&group=5&Page=Baroness%20Wilkins%20:%20Political%20Biography
 parliament.uk

1946 births
Labour Party (UK) life peers
Living people
Life peeresses created by Elizabeth II